Elisabeth Cornelia "Els" Vader (married Scharn) (24 September 1959 – 8 February 2021) was a track and field sprinter from the Netherlands. She competed at the 1980, 1984 and 1988 Summer Olympics in the 100 m, 200 m and 4 × 100 m relay (in 1988 only), but failed to reach the finals in any event.

Vader was Holland's leading sprinter in the 1980s, alongside Nelli Cooman. Altogether she gathered 23 national championships in the various outdoor and indoor sprint events. She won the bronze medal in the women's 200 metres at the 1985 European Indoor Championships.

She was married to former athlete and coach Haico Scharn.

She died from major duodenal papilla cancer.

International competitions

1Did not finish in the quarterfinals
2Did not start in the final
3Disqualified in the semifinals
4Did not start in the semifinals

References

External links

 
 
 
 

1959 births
2021 deaths
Dutch female sprinters
Olympic athletes of the Netherlands
Athletes (track and field) at the 1980 Summer Olympics
Athletes (track and field) at the 1984 Summer Olympics
Athletes (track and field) at the 1988 Summer Olympics
World Athletics Championships athletes for the Netherlands
Sportspeople from Vlissingen
Olympic female sprinters